Diamant is a French expendable launch rocket system.

Diamant may also refer to:

People
 Diamant (surname)

Transportation
 Diamant (German bicycle company), established 1862
 Diamant (Norwegian bicycle company), established 1901
 Diamant (train), an international train linking Belgium and Germany
 Diamant (Antwerp premetro station), a station on the Antwerp Pre-metro
 Diamant premetro station, a station on the Brussels Metro
 FFA Diamant, a Swiss family of gliders
 ITV Diamant, a French paraglider
 Ocean Diamond, a cruise ship formerly named Le Diamant
 Piel Diamant, a French single-engine aircraft

Places
 Canton of Le Diamant, a former canton in Martinique
 Le Diamant, a town and commune in Martinique
 Cap Diamant, the cape on which Quebec City is located
 Diamond Rock (Rocher du Diamant), an island off the coast of Martinique

Arts and entertainment
 Diamant (board game), a multiplayer game designed by Alan R. Moon and Bruno Faidutti
 Diamant (film), a 1916 Dutch silent film
 "Diamant" (song), a 2020 song by Swiss singer Lucas Hänni

Other uses
 Diamant Yaoundé, a football club based in Yaoundé, Cameroon
 Diamant, a Czech high yield, short height, mutant barley variety

See also
 
 Diamond (disambiguation)
 Diament (disambiguation)
 Dimond (disambiguation)
 Dyment (disambiguation)
 Dymond (disambiguation)

ru:Диамант (значения)